Soso Tamarau (born 16 May 1984) is a Nigerian freestyle wrestler. At the 2016 Summer Olympics he competed in the Men’s freestyle -97 kg.

In 2021, he competed at the 2021 African & Oceania Wrestling Olympic Qualification Tournament hoping to qualify for the 2020 Summer Olympics in Tokyo, Japan.

References

External links
 

1984 births
Living people
Olympic wrestlers of Nigeria
Wrestlers at the 2016 Summer Olympics
Commonwealth Games competitors for Nigeria
Wrestlers at the 2014 Commonwealth Games
African Games gold medalists for Nigeria
African Games silver medalists for Nigeria
African Games medalists in wrestling
Competitors at the 2015 African Games
Competitors at the 2019 African Games
African Wrestling Championships medalists
20th-century Nigerian people
21st-century Nigerian people